Pomatoschistus quagga, the Quagga goby, is a species of goby native to the western part of the Mediterranean Sea and the Adriatic Sea.  It occurs above soft substrates and in beds of eelgrass.  This species can reach a length of  TL.

References

Fish of the Mediterranean Sea
Fish of Europe
quagga
Fish described in 1837